Dactylina arctica is a species of fungus within the family Parmeliaceae. Common names for this lichen are finger lichen and Arctic finger lichen. A specific area in which this lichen occurs is represented by the boreal forests of Canada.

See also
 Reindeer lichen

References
 C. Michael Hogan.  2008. Black Spruce: Picea mariana, GlobalTwitcher.com, ed. N. Stromberg
 ITIS. 2009. Dactylina arctica

Line notes

Lichens described in 1823
Lichen species
Lichens of North America
Parmeliaceae
Taxa named by William Jackson Hooker
Lichens of the Arctic